The Chicago, Milwaukee, St. Paul and Pacific Railroad Company Depot, also known as Fayette Depot, is a historic building located northeast of Fayette, Iowa, United States.  The Chicago, Milwaukee, St. Paul and Pacific Railroad reached Fayette in 1874 and this depot was built at that time to serve as a combination passenger and freight station.  It was hoped that a rail station in centrally located Fayette would mean the city would become the county seat for Fayette County, but West Union to the north got the designation instead.  The single-story frame structure has a bay window to give the telegraph operator a view up and down the tracks. An addition was constructed in 1913.  It served as the community's rail depot well into the 20th century.  It was moved to its current location in the Volga River State Recreation Area.  The building was listed on the National Register of Historic Places in 1978.

References

Railway stations in the United States opened in 1874
Fayette
Transportation buildings and structures in Fayette County, Iowa
National Register of Historic Places in Fayette County, Iowa
Railway stations on the National Register of Historic Places in Iowa
Former railway stations in Iowa